Ilona Kökény (7 April 1891 - 1 July 1947) was a Hungarian actress. She appeared in more than forty films from 1918 to 1944.

Selected filmography

References

External links 

1891 births
1947 deaths
Hungarian film actresses